Tonganah is a rural locality in the local government area of Dorset in the North-east region of Tasmania. The 2016 census determined a population of 26 for the state suburb of Tonganah.

History
Tonganah was gazetted as a locality in 1979. The name is an Aboriginal word meaning “to swallow”.

Geography
The Great Forester River passes through from south-west to north.

Road infrastructure
The Tasman Highway (A3) passes through from south-west to east. Route C831 (Jensens Road) starts at an intersection with A3 and runs north before exiting.

References

Localities of Dorset Council (Australia)
Towns in Tasmania